Gregory George Heydeman (born January 2, 1952) is a former pitcher in Major League Baseball. 

Greg attended Monterey High School (Monterey, California) and was signed by the Los Angeles Dodgers as an undrafted free agent in 1971. He pitched only two innings for the Los Angeles Dodgers against the Houston Astros on September 2, 1973. He allowed 2 hits, 1 earned run, struck out 1 and walked 1 in his brief major league stint.

External links

Major League Baseball pitchers
Los Angeles Dodgers players
Baseball players from California
Living people
1952 births
Bakersfield Dodgers players
Daytona Beach Dodgers players
Waterbury Dodgers players
Albuquerque Dukes players
Lodi Dodgers players
People from Carmel-by-the-Sea, California